Undulambia fovecosta is a moth in the family Crambidae. It is found in Panama, Guatemala and Costa Rica.

Species 

 Undulambia albitessellalis
 Undulambia arnoulalis 
 Undulambia asaphalis
 Undulambia cantiusalis (Schaus, 1924)
 Undulambia cymialis (Hampson, 1907)
 Undulambia dendalis
 Undulambia electrale (Dyar, 1914)
 Undulambia flavicostalis
 Undulambia fovecosta
 Undulambia fulvicolor
 Undulambia fulvitinctalis (Hampson, 1897)
 Undulambia grisealis (Hampson, 1906)
 Undulambia hemigrammalis
 Undulambia intortalis
 Undulambia jonesalis
 Undulambia leucocymalis (Hampson, 1906)
 Undulambia leucostictalis
 Undulambia lindbladi B. Landry in Landry & Roque-Albelo, 2006
 Undulambia marconalis
 Undulambia niveiplagalis (Hampson, 1917)
 Undulambia oedizonalis (Hampson, 1906)
 Undulambia perornatalis (Schaus, 1912)
 Undulambia phaeochroalis (Hampson, 1906)
 Undulambia polystichalis
 Undulambia rarissima Munroe, 1972
 Undulambia semilunalis
 Undulambia striatalis (Dyar, 1906)
 Undulambia symphorasalis (Schaus, 1924)
 Undulambia tigrinale
 Undulambia vitrinalis (C. Felder, R. Felder & Rogenhofer, 1875)

References

Moths described in 1914
Musotiminae